Gili Karan (also Romanized as Gīlī Karān and Geylī Karān; also known as Gailikarān, Gelīkarān, Gili Garan, Golī Garān, Kailigiran, and Kīlī Karān) is a village in Sarshiv Rural District, Sarshiv District, Marivan County, Kurdistan Province, Iran. At the 2006 census, its population was 316, in 65 families. The village is populated by Kurds.

References 

Towns and villages in Marivan County
Kurdish settlements in Kurdistan Province